Percival King (9 December 1835 – 29 October 1910) was an English cricketer. He played one first-class match for Surrey in 1871.

See also
 List of Surrey County Cricket Club players

References

External links
 

1835 births
1910 deaths
English cricketers
Surrey cricketers
People from Stockwell
Cricketers from Greater London